The Parable of the Prodigal Son is a parable of Jesus from the Bible.

The Prodigal Son or Prodigal Son may also refer to:

Film
 L'Enfant prodigue (1907 film) (The Prodigal Son), by Michel Carré, based on his play
 , a short silent film by Georges Berr
 The Prodigal Son (1923 film), a British silent film based on Hall Caine's novel
 The Prodigal Son (1934 film), a German film
 The Prodigal Son, a 1952 Hong Kong film directed by Ng Wui
 The Prodigal Son (1962 film), an Australian TV production of an opera by Debussy
 The Prodigal Son (1981 film), a Hong Kong comedy film directed by Sammo Hung
 The Prodigal Son (1993 film), a short animation
The Prodigal (1931 film), an American pre-Code film 
The Prodigal, a 1955 biblical epic film 
The Prodigal (1983 film), 1983 directed by James F. Collier
Prodigal Sons (film), a 2008 American documentary

Literature
  
The Prodigal Son (Hall Caine novel), 1904
 Prodigal Son (novel), by Dean Koontz, 2005

Music
 Prodigal Son (musician), Calvin Curtis Whilby (born 1976), Jamaican gospel singer

Classical
 L'enfant prodigue (Auber) (The Prodigal Son), an 1850 grand opera by Daniel Auber
 The Prodigal Son (Sullivan), an 1869 oratorio by Arthur Sullivan
 L'enfant prodigue (The Prodigal Son), a 1884 cantata by Debussy 
 The Prodigal Son (ballet), a 1929 ballet by George Balanchine
 The Prodigal Son, music for the ballet by Prokofiev
 The Prodigal Son, a 1938 ballet by David Lichine
 The Prodigal Son a 1945 opera by Frederick Jacobi
 The Prodigal Son (Den förlorade sonen), a 1957 ballet suite by Hugo Alfvén
 The Prodigal Son (Britten), a 1968 opera by Benjamin Britten

Albums
 The Prodigal Son (Keith Green album), 1983
 Prodigal Son (The Saints album), 1988
 Prodigal Son (Martin Simpson album), 2007
 The Prodigal Son (Nektar album), 2001
 The Prodigal Son, disc 2 of G-Funk Classics, Vol. 1 & 2 by Nate Dogg, 1988
 The Prodigal Son (Ry Cooder album), 2018
 Prodigal Sons, a 1983 album by The Dubliners

Songs
 "The Prodigal Son", a song written by Robert Wilkins
 covered by the Rolling Stones on the 1968 album Beggars Banquet
 "Prodigal Son", a single by Steel Pulse from the 1978 album Handsworth Revolution
 "Prodigal Son", a song by Iron Maiden from the 1981 album Killers
 "Prodigal Son", a single by Kid Rock from the 1993 album The Polyfuze Method (also re-recorded for the 2000 compilation The History of Rock)
 "The Prodigal Son", a song Two Gallants by from the 2006 album What the Toll Tells
 "Prodigal Son", a song by Bad Religion from the 2007 album New Maps of Hell
 "Prodigal Son" (Sevendust song), 2008
 "Prodigal Son", a song by Sam Amidon from the 2008 album All Is Well
 "Prodigal Son", a song by Kamelot from the 2012 album Silverthorn

Painting and sculpture
The Return of the Prodigal Son (Rembrandt), a painting, c. 1669
The Prodigal Son (Giorgio de Chirico), a painting, 1922
The Prodigal Son (Rubens), a painting by Peter Paul Rubens, 1618
The Prodigal Son (van Hemessen), a painting by Jan Sanders van Hemessen, 1536
The Prodigal Son (sculpture), by Rodin

Television
 "The Prodigal Son" an episode of War of the Worlds
 "Prodigal Son", an episode of Miami Vice season 2
 "Prodigal Son", an episode of Everybody Loves Raymond season 4
 "Prodigal Son", an episode of Teenage Mutant Ninja Turtles season 4
Prodigal Son (TV series), an American drama series airing on Fox

Theatre
 The Prodigal Son (play), a 1951 play by Peter Wessel Zapffe
The Prodigal Son, a 1905 play based on The Prodigal Son (Hall Caine novel)
 Prodigal Son, a 2016 play by John Patrick Shanley
The Prodigal, a 1960 play by Jack Richardson
 , a 1736 play by Voltaire

See also 
 Prodigal Daughter (disambiguation)
 Lost Son (disambiguation)
 The Prodigal (disambiguation)
Return of the Prodigal Son (disambiguation)
 Prodigal Sun, a 2000 album by The Dawn